The Church of St. Louis of the French is a Roman Catholic church in Moscow, built 1790–91. It is located in the neighborhood of the Lubyanka, in the city center. The church was founded by and belongs to the French parish of the same name.

History
By an agreement with France on December 31, 1786, the French nationals living in Russia were granted freedom of worship and permission to establish churches. By this ordinance, they could freely perform the celebrations and duties of their religion, both in their homes and in their churches.

The first French Church of St. Louis was established in an existing building and was consecrated on 30 March 1791. A larger building was later constructed and was consecrated on 24 November 1835 by the dean of Moscow, Archbishop Igor Motchoulevski, in the presence "of all city authorities".

After the fall of communism in 1991, the church was returned to the French parish.  The Catholic hierarchy was restored in Russia and a new priest, Father Bernard Léannec, was appointed.

The Church of St. Louis of the French is a symbol of Catholicism in Russia, and freedom and religious tolerance. It was visited by General de Gaulle in 1944 and on 3 December 1964, and also by Konrad Adenauer, Lech Walesa and Jacques Chirac, and other political and religious figures.

See also
Roman Catholicism in Russia
St. Louis Church

References

French diaspora in Europe
Churches in Moscow
Roman Catholic churches completed in 1835
19th-century Roman Catholic church buildings in Russia
Cultural heritage monuments of federal significance in Moscow